The Tanizaki Prize (谷崎潤一郎賞 Tanizaki Jun'ichirō Shō), named in honor of the Japanese novelist Jun'ichirō Tanizaki, is one of Japan's most sought-after literary awards. It was established in 1965 by the publishing company Chūō Kōronsha Inc. to commemorate its 80th anniversary as a publisher. It is awarded annually to a full-length representative work of fiction or drama of the highest literary merit by a professional writer. The winner receives a commemorative plaque and a cash prize of 1 million yen.

Winners
Award sponsor Chuokoron-Shinsha maintains an official list of current and past winning works.

1965 Kojima Nobuo for Embracing Family (Hōyō kazoku, 抱擁家族)
1966 Endō Shūsaku for Silence (Chinmoku, 沈黙)
1967 Kenzaburō Ōe for The Silent Cry (Manen gannen no futtoboru, 万延元年のフットボール)
1967 Abe Kobo for Friends (Tomodachi, 友達)
1968 (no prize awarded)
1969 Enchi Fumiko for Shu wo ubau mono; Kizu aru tsubasa; Niji to shura (朱を奪うもの/傷ある翼/虹と修羅)
1970 Yutaka Haniya for Black Horse In The Midst Of Darkness (Yami no naka no kuroi uma, 闇のなかの黒い馬)
1970 Yoshiyuki Junnosuke for The Dark Room (Anshitsu, 暗室)
1971 Noma Hiroshi for Seinen no wa (青年の環)
1972 Maruya Saiichi for A Singular Rebellion (Tatta hitori no hanran, たった一人の反乱)
1973 Kaga Otohiko for Kaerazaru natsu (帰らざる夏)
1974 Usui Yoshimi for Azumino (安曇野)
1975 Minakami Tsutomu for Ikkyū (一休)
1976 Fujieda Shizuo for Denshin ugaku (田紳有楽)
1977 Shimao Toshio for Hi no utsuroi (日の移ろい)
1978 Nakamura Shin'ichirō for Summer (Natsu, 夏)
1979 Tanaka Komimasa for Poroporo (ポロポロ)
1980 Kono Taeko for Ichinen no banka  (一年の牧歌)
1981 Fukazawa Shichiro for Michinoku no ningyotachi (みちのくの人形たち)
1981 Goto Akio for Yoshinodayu (吉野大夫)
1982 Oba Minako for Katachi mo naku (寂兮寥兮)
1983 Furui Yoshikichi for Morning Glory (Asagao, 槿)
1984 Kuroi Senji for Life in the Cul-de-Sac (Gunsei, 群棲)
1984 Takai Yuichi for This Country's Sky (Kono kuni no sora, この国の空)
1985 Haruki Murakami for Hard-Boiled Wonderland and the End of the World (Sekai no owari to Hādoboirudo Wandārando, 世界の終わりとハードボイルド・ワンダーランド)
1986 Hino Keizo for Sakyu ga ugoku yō ni (砂丘が動くように)
1987 Tsutsui Yasutaka for  Yumenokizaka bunkiten (夢の木坂分岐点)
1988 (no prize awarded)
1989 (no prize awarded) 
1990 Hayashi Kyoko for Yasurakani ima wa nemuri tamae (やすらかに今はねむり給え)
1991 Inoue Hisashi for Shanghai Moon (Shanhai Mūn, シャンハイムーン)
1992 Setouchi Jakucho for Hana ni toe (花に問え)
1993 Ikezawa Natsuki for The Navidad Incident: The Downfall of Matías Guili (Mashiasu giri no shikkyaku,  マシアス・ギリの失脚)
1994 Tsujii Takashi for Rainbow Cove (Niji no misaki, 虹の岬)
1995 Tsuji Kunio for Saigyō kaden (西行花伝)
1996 (no prize awarded)
1997 Hosaka Kazushi for Kisetsu no kioku (季節の記憶)
1997 Miki Taku for Roji (路地)
1998 Tsushima Yūko for Mountain of Fire: Account of a Wild Monkey (Hi no yama - yamazaruki, 火の山―山猿記)
1999 Takagi Nobuko for Translucent Tree (Tokō no ki, (透光の樹)
2000 Tsujihara Noboru for Yudotei Maruki (遊動亭円木)
2000 Murakami Ryū for A Symbiotic Parasite (Kyoseichu, 共生虫)
2001 Hiromi Kawakami for The Briefcase aka Strange Weather in Tokyo (Sensei no kaban, センセイの鞄)
2002: (no prize awarded)
2003: Tawada Yoko for Suspect On The Night Train (Yōgisha no yakōressha, 容疑者の夜行列車)
2004: Horie Toshiyuki for Yukinuma and Its Environs (Yukinuma to sono shūhen, 雪沼とその周辺)
2005: Machida Kō for Confession (Kokuhaku, 告白)
2005: Amy Yamada for Wonderful Flavor (Fūmizekka, 風味絶佳)
2006: Yōko Ogawa for Meena's March (Mīna no Kōshin, ミーナの行進)
2007: Seirai Yuichi for Bakushin (爆心)
2008: Natsuo Kirino for Tokyo-jima (東京島)
2009: (no prize awarded)
2010: Kazushige Abe for Pistils (Pisutoruzu, ピストルズ)
2011: Mayumi Inaba for To the Peninsula (半島へ)
2012: Genichiro Takahashi for Goodbye, Christopher Robin (さよならクリストファー・ロビン)
2013: Mieko Kawakami for Dreams of Love (Ai no Yume to ka, 愛の夢とか)
2014: Hikaru Okuizumi for The Autobiography of Tokyo (Tōkyō jijoden, 東京自叙伝)
2015: Kaori Ekuni for Geckos, Frogs, and Butterflies (Yamori Kaeru Shijimichō, ヤモリ、カエル、シジミチョウ)
2016: Akiko Itoyama for Hakujyō (薄情)
2016: Yū Nagashima for San no Tonari wa Gogōshitsu (三の隣は五号室)
2017: Hisaki Matsuura for honour and trance (Meiyo to Kōkotsu, 名誉と恍惚)
2018: Tomoyuki Hoshino for 
2019: Kiyoko Murata for 
2020: Kenichiro Isozaki for Nihon Momai Zenshi (日本蒙昧前史)
2021: Kanehara Hitomi for Unsocial Distance (Ansōsharudisutansu, アンソーシャルディスタンス)
2022: Banana Yoshimoto for Miton to fubin'' (ミトンとふびん)

See also
 List of Japanese literary awards

References

1965 establishments in Japan
Awards established in 1965
Japanese literary awards
Japanese-language literary awards